Tham Chalong is a tambon (sub-district) of Mueang Uttaradit District, in Uttaradit Province, Thailand. In 2015 it had a population of 2,800 people.

History 
The sub-district was created effective 1 August 1984 by splitting off three administrative villages from Hat Ngio.

Administration

Central administration
The tambon is divided into four administrative villages (muban).

Local administration
The area of the sub-district is covered by the sub-district administrative organization (SAO) Tham Chalong (องค์การบริหารส่วนตำบลถ้ำฉลอง).

References

External links
Thaitambon.com on Tham Chalong

Tambon of Uttaradit province
Populated places in Uttaradit province